Ygor Tadeu de Souza (born July 27, 1986, in Santos), commonly known as Ygor, is a Brazilian striker who has recently played for Chengdu Blades in the China League One.

External links
 CBF
 soccerway

1986 births
Living people
Brazilian footballers
ACF Gloria Bistrița players
Chengdu Tiancheng F.C. players
China League One players
Expatriate footballers in China
Brazilian expatriate sportspeople in China
Association football forwards